The 13th District of the Iowa Senate is located in southwestern Iowa, and is currently composed of Appanoose, Davis, Monroe and Wapello Counties.

Current elected officials
Cherielynn Westrich is the senator currently representing the 13th District.

The area of the 13th District contains two Iowa House of Representatives districts:
The 25th District (represented by Hans Wilz)
The 26th District (represented by Austin Harris)

The district is also located in Iowa's 3rd congressional district, which is represented by U.S. Representative Zach Nunn.

Past senators
The district has previously been represented by:

Thomas Lind, 1983–1986
Jim Lind, 1986–1997
Patricia Harper, 1997–2002
Roger Stewart, 2003–2010
Tod Bowman, 2011–2012
Kent Sorenson, 2013–2014
Julian Garrett, 2014–2022
Cherielynn Westrich, 2023–present

See also
Iowa General Assembly
Iowa Senate

References

13